Yarraman railway station is a relatively minor commuter railway station on the Pakenham and Cranbourne lines of the metropolitan railway network in Victoria, Australia, located about  from the Melbourne CBD. Opening on 21 December 1976, it serves the southeastern Melbourne suburb of Noble Park, and is named after the nearby Yarraman Creek, a first-order tributary of the lower Dandenong Creek/Patterson River system.

To allow construction of the station, the existing track towards Flinders Street was slewed in 1974. During construction, an alternative name for the station, Fotheringham, a notable local family, was suggested.

The EastLink toll road is located at the down (southeastern) end of the station, crossing via an overpass across the railway line, Railway Parade and Hanna Street.

In 2015, the Level Crossing Removal Authority announced the grade separation of the nearby Chandler Road level crossing. Construction began in 2016, with the level crossing removed in 2018. Unlike with many level crossing removal projects, the station was not rebuilt.

Platforms and services

Yarraman station has one island platform with two faces, accessible only via only a ramped elevated footbridge at its southeastern end. It is serviced by Metro Trains' Pakenham and Cranbourne line services. The Department of Transport has also planned to connect the Pakenham and Cranbourne lines to the Sunbury line, through the new Metro Tunnel, in late 2025.

During peak hours, limited express services towards Flinders Street, Pakenham and Cranbourne often skip the station. V/Line services on the Traralgon and Bairnsdale line also skip the station at full speed both ways.

Platform 1:
  all stations and limited express services to Flinders Street
  all stations and limited express services to Flinders Street

Platform 2:
  all stations services to Pakenham
  all stations services to Cranbourne

Future services:
In addition to the current services the Network Development Plan Metropolitan Rail proposes linking the Pakenham and Cranbourne lines to both the Sunbury line and under-construction Melbourne Airport rail link via the Metro Tunnel.
  express services to West Footscray and Sunbury (2025 onwards)
  express services to Melbourne Airport (2029 onwards)

Transport links

Ventura Bus Lines operates three routes via Yarraman station, under contract to Public Transport Victoria:
 : Dandenong station – Brighton
 : Dandenong station – Waverley Gardens Shopping Centre
 : Dandenong station – Noble Park station

Gallery

References

External links
 Melway map at street-directory.com.au

Railway stations in Melbourne
Railway stations in Australia opened in 1976
Railway stations in the City of Greater Dandenong